Visa requirements for Cuban citizens are administrative entry restrictions by the authorities of other states placed on citizens of Cuba.   Cuban citizens had visa-free or visa on arrival access to 65 countries and territories, ranking the Cuban passport 82nd in the world (tied with Ghana and Morocco) in terms of travel freedom according to the Henley Passport Index.

Visa requirements map

Visa requirements
Visa requirements for holders of ordinary passports travelling for tourism purposes:

Territories and disputed areas
Visa requirements for Cuban citizens for visits to various territories, disputed areas and restricted zones:

Non-visa restrictions

See also

 Visa policy of Cuba
 Cuban passport

References and Notes
References

Notes

Cuba
Foreign relations of Cuba